Aram Van Ballaert (29 May 1971) is a Belgian guitarist and composer who is active since 1988. His classical guitar background resulted in a series of concerts throughout Europe, Africa, and the Middle-East. Since 2012, Van Ballaert has been a composer for films and television.

Career 
After being involved in several international co-productions as a guest musician with Belgian orchestras like the Royal Philharmonic Orchestra of Flanders and the Flemish Radio Orchestra, Van Ballaert started building a solo career.

The CDs Danza (2002) and TRI (2005) resulted in a series of concerts throughout Belgium, the Netherlands, Bulgaria, Hungary, Ukraine, the Democratic Republic of Congo and Saudi Arabia. In co-operation with the ensemble Piacevole and bandoneon player Alfredo Marcucci, Van Ballaert performed as a soloist in numerous performances of the double concerto of Astor Piazzolla.

As a pop musician, Van Ballaert is the guitarist of Ronny Mosuse and Novastar, of which there is a live DVD (EMI) released in 2009. Since 2008, Van Ballaert is also playing the drums in The Clement Peerens Explosition, a trio led by Hugo Matthysen.

In addition to the above, Van Ballaert is working as a composer for television and film. In 2012, he has written the soundtrack for Belgian prime time series Quiz Me Quick, directed by Jan Matthys and written by Bart De Pauw.

Besides his performing activities, Van Ballaert lectures at the Lemmensinstituut (University for Science and Arts) in Leuven, Belgium.

Discography

Albums 
 The Hum (2000) – in cooperation with Anton Walgrave
 Before The Dawn (2002) – in cooperation with Anton Walgrave
 Danza (2002) – solo
 Stronger (2002) – in cooperation with Ronny Mosuse
 TRI (2005) – solo
 Shine (2006) – in cooperation with Anton Walgrave
 Allemaal Anders (2008) – in cooperation with Ronny Mosuse
 Almost Bangor (2008) – in cooperation with Novastar
 Masterworks (2008) – in cooperation with Clement Peerens Explosition
 Olraait! (2011) – in cooperation with Clement Peerens Explosition
 Quiz me Quick (2012) – Aram & ensemble

DVD 
 Live in Congo (2008) – in cooperation with Ronny Mosuse
 Almost Bangor (Live) (2009) – in cooperation with Novastar

Composition for Television 
 Quiz me Quick (2012) – Director Jan Matthys / Screenplay Bart De Pauw

References

Belgian male guitarists
Belgian composers
Male composers
Belgian male musicians
1971 births
Living people
21st-century guitarists
21st-century male musicians